Hertfordshire County Cricket Club was established on 8 March 1876. It has since played minor counties cricket from 1895 and played List A cricket from 1964 to 2004, using a different number of home grounds during that time. Their first home minor counties fixture in 1895 was against Norfolk at Cricketfield Lane, Bishop's Stortford, while their first home List A match came 71 years later against Berkshire in the 1966 Gillette Cup at the Lucas Lane, Hitchin.

The 24 grounds that Hertfordshire have used for home matches since 1895 are listed below, with statistics complete through to the end of the 2014 season.

Grounds

List A
Below is a complete list of grounds used by Hertfordshire County Cricket Club when it was permitted to play List A matches. These grounds have also held Minor Counties Championship and MCCA Knockout Trophy matches.

Minor Counties
Below is a complete list of grounds used by Hertfordshire County Cricket Club in Minor Counties Championship and MCCA Knockout Trophy matches.

Notes

References

Hertfordshire County Cricket Club
Cricket grounds in Hertfordshire
Hertfordshire